Phillip L. Geissler (March 27, 1974 – July 17, 2022) was a theoretical chemist at UC Berkeley. He was the Aldo De Benedictis Distinguished Professor of Chemistry.

Biography 
Geissler was born in 1974 in Ithaca, New York. He grew up in Charlottesville and in Richmond, Virginia, graduating from Douglas S. Freeman High School. He attended Cornell University as an undergrad from 1992 to 1996. His senior thesis was titled A Theory for the Dynamics of Polymer Melts. After that, he received his masters' degree and PhD from UC Berkeley, graduating in 2000. He was a postdoc at UC Berkeley in 2000 and a postdoc under Eugene Shakhnovich at Harvard in 2001. He was also an MIT Science Fellow from 2001 to 2003. Finally, he joined UC Berkeley as faculty in 2003, where he became a full professor in 2012.

Geissler received the UC Berkeley Distinguished Teaching Award in 2011.

On July 17, 2022, Geissler was hiking in Canyonlands National Park, attempting a hike from Elephant Hill, and went missing. His body was found on July 19.

Research and career 
Geissler established a program in non-equilibrium statistical mechanics. He gave the 2012 Baker Lecture, titled Why would a small ion adsorb to the air-water interface? and ran a colloqium titled When soft interfaces go still: fluctuating roughness as a driving force in nanoscale assembly. His research interests included chemical phenomena in condensed phases, biomolecular structure and dynamics, fluctuations in nanomaterials, the elasticity of disordered networks of semiflexible polymers, and the dynamics of nanosolutes in a liquid undergoing phase transition.

Geissler was known for playing chemistry-themed songs on his guitar (such as "The Mole Song" or "Acids and Bases") when teaching class. He was also known for giving the same "quiz" on the first day of class.

Geissler was an editorial committee member for Annual Reviews of Physical Chemistry, Journal of Chemical Physics, Chemical Physics Letters, and Journal of Physical Chemistry.

Geissler was also affiliated with Lawrence Berkeley National Laboratory and the California Institute for Quantitative Biosciences.

Personal life 
Geissler's hobbies and interests included California wine, guitar playing, hiking, watching soccer or baseball, science fiction, and woodworking.

References

External links 
 

1974 births
2022 deaths
Theoretical chemists
UC Berkeley College of Chemistry faculty
Scientists from Ithaca, New York
Lawrence Berkeley National Laboratory people
Cornell University alumni